Father John Ikataere Rarikin, M.S.C. (5 January 1944 − 8 February 2014) was a Roman Catholic priest who served as the Ecclesiastical Superior of the Mission sui iuris of Funafuti since 2010 to 2014.

Life
Rarikin was born in Butaritari, Kiribati. He was the 3rd eldest in a family of 4 boys and 6 girls. In the young age he joined an Institute of Consecrated Life of Missionaries of the Sacred Heart and was ordained as priest on 30 September 1972. Also he  studied at Rome in the Gregorian University.

References

1944 births
20th-century Roman Catholic priests
21st-century Roman Catholic priests
Pontifical Gregorian University alumni
2014 deaths
Tuvaluan clergy